Ruka may refer to:

People
, Japanese actress
, Japanese football player
, Japanese snowboarder
, Japanese professional footballer

Other
 Ruka (Okage), a fictional character
 Rukatunturi (Finnish: Ruka), a ski resort in Finland
 Ruka Souen, a character from the Vampire Knight manga series and its anime
Ruka (Mapuche), an indigenous housing form
 Ruka, a character from the anime and manga series YuYu Hakusho
 Ruka, a playable character from Fire Emblem Gaiden
 Ruka, a playable character from Tear Ring Saga
 The Hand, Czech animated short film,

Japanese feminine given names
Japanese unisex given names